The Missing Juror is a 1944 American film noir mystery film directed by Budd Boetticher (as Oscar Boetticher Jr.) and starring Jim Bannon, Janis Carter, George Macready and Jean Stevens.

Plot
A reporter tries to stop whoever is murdering the jurors on a notorious murder case.

Cast
 Jim Bannon as Joe Keats
 Janis Carter as Alice Hill
 George Macready as Harry Wharton/ Jerome K. Bentley
 Jean Stevens as Tex Tuttle
 Joseph Crehan as Willard Apple aka Falstaff

See also
 List of American films of 1944

References

External links
 
 
 

1944 films
American mystery films
Columbia Pictures films
1944 mystery films
Films directed by Budd Boetticher
1940s English-language films
1940s American films